Dr. Coppelius (or El Fantástico mundo del doctor Coppelius) is a 1966 Spanish English-language comedy film based on the ballet Coppélia directed by Ted Kneeland and featuring Walter Slezak and Claudia Corday. Produced by Samuel Bronston, is also known as The Mysterious House of Dr. C.

Production
Filming took place in Spain in late 1966.

Reception
The New York Times called it a "spooky but nonthreatening confection", though it noted the title of its American release, was misleading: "Not a horror flick as one might assume, The Mysterious House of Dr. C is a respectable adaptation" of Kneeland's ballet.

References

External links

1966 films
Spanish comedy films
1966 comedy films
Ballet films
Films based on The Sandman (short story)
1960s English-language films
1960s Spanish films